C.D.Girls Inter College is a senior secondary school in the city of Rura in Kanpur Dehat district, Uttar Pradesh, India. It is affiliated with U P Madhyamik Shiksha Parishad Allahabad. It is a government aided institution.

Location

It is located in the city heart place of Rura and near R P S Inter College. The school is 1 kilometer away from the railway station Rura. Only rickshaw is available from railway station Rura and bus stop Rura.

List of Principals

 Rama Jaiswal
 Rama Mishra (off.)
 Vasim Akhtar (off.)
 Shakuntala Devi(off.)
 Suman Lata Singh (off.)

Gallery

References

Intermediate colleges in Uttar Pradesh
Girls' schools in Uttar Pradesh
Primary schools in Uttar Pradesh
High schools and secondary schools in Uttar Pradesh
Education in Kanpur Dehat district
Educational institutions established in 1965
1965 establishments in Uttar Pradesh